Varab may refer to:

Jeffrey J. Varab, American animator
Voru, Razavi Khorasan, village in Iran